Architectural Engineer (PE) is a professional engineering designation in the United States. The architectural engineer applies the knowledge and skills of broader engineering disciplines to the design, construction, operation, maintenance, and renovation of buildings and their component systems while paying careful attention to their effects on the surrounding environment.

With the establishment of a specific "Architectural Engineering" NCEES professional engineering registration examination in the 1990s and first offering in April 2003, architectural engineering is now recognized as a distinct engineering discipline in the United States.

Note that in the United States Architects are not to be confused with "architectural engineering technology" which is different from architectural engineering; in the United States architectural engineering technologists tend to be "Engineering Technicians" that utilize CAD technology as drafters or technical assistants who do not have a license to practice either Architecture or Engineering, usually hired by larger construction firms or developers who prefer to cut out architectural design and maintain high costs of construction for standard processes and common building materials, while in Europe, Canada, South Africa and other countries Architectural technologists have a role similar to Architects and Architectural Engineers.

Areas of focus
 Architecture (if licensed as an Architect)
 Structural engineering
 Construction engineering
 Construction management
 Project management
 Green building
 Heating, ventilation and air conditioning (HVAC)
 Plumbing and piping (hydronics)
 Energy management
 Fire protection engineering
 Building power systems
 Lighting
 Building transportation systems
 Acoustics, noise & vibration control

A common combined specialization is Mechanical, Electrical and Plumbing, better known by its abbreviation MEP.  An MEP design engineer has experience in HVAC, lighting/electrical, and plumbing systems' analysis and design.

Some topics of special interest
 Building construction
 Building Information Modeling (BIM)
 Efficient energy use, Energy conservation or Energy demand management
 Renewable energy
 Solar energy
 Green buildings
 Intelligent buildings
 Autonomous buildings
 Indoor air quality
 Thermal comfort

Educational institutions offering bachelor's degrees in architectural engineering
Programs accredited by the Engineering Accreditation Commission (EAC) of ABET and that are members of Architectural Engineering Institute (AEI) are denoted below.

 California Polytechnic State University, San Luis Obispo, California (ABET, AEI)
 Drexel University, Philadelphia, Pennsylvania (ABET, AEI)
 Illinois Institute of Technology, Chicago, Illinois (ABET, AEI)
 Kansas State University, Manhattan, Kansas (ABET, AEI)
 Lawrence Technological University, Southfield, Michigan (ABET)
 Milwaukee School of Engineering, Milwaukee, Wisconsin (ABET, AEI)
 North Carolina A&T State University, Greensboro, North Carolina (ABET, AEI)
 Oklahoma State University, Stillwater, Oklahoma (ABET, AEI)
 Oregon State University, Corvallis, Oregon
 Penn State University, State College, Pennsylvania (ABET, AEI)
 Tennessee State University, Nashville, Tennessee (ABET, AEI)
 Texas A&M University, College Station, Texas
 Texas A&M University, Kingsville, Kingsville, Texas (ABET, AEI)
 University of Alabama, Tuscaloosa, Alabama (ABET)
 University of Arizona, Tucson, Arizona
 University of Arkansas at Little Rock, Little Rock, Arkansas (ABET)
 University of Cincinnati, Cincinnati, Ohio (ABET)
 University of Colorado at Boulder, Boulder, Colorado (ABET, AEI)
 University of Detroit Mercy, Detroit, Michigan (ABET)
 University of Kansas, Lawrence, Kansas (ABET, AEI)
 University of Miami, Miami, Florida (ABET, AEI)
 Missouri University of Science and Technology, Rolla, Missouri (ABET, AEI)
 University of Nebraska at Omaha, Omaha, Nebraska (ABET, AEI)
 University of Oklahoma, Norman, Oklahoma (ABET)
 University of Texas at Arlington, Arlington, Texas
 University of Texas at Austin, Austin, Texas (ABET, AEI)
 University of Wyoming, Laramie, Wyoming (ABET, AEI)
 Worcester Polytechnic Institute, Worcester, Massachusetts (ABET)

See also
Accreditation Board for Engineering and Technology
American Society of Heating, Refrigerating and Air-Conditioning Engineers
American Society of Plumbing Engineers
Architectural Engineering Institute
Architectural technologist
Associated General Contractors of America
Illuminating Engineering Society of North America
National Society of Professional Engineers
Society of Fire Protection Engineers
Structural engineering
U.S. Green Building Council

References 

Building engineering
Engineering occupations
Engineering